This is a list of tunnels documented by the Historic American Engineering Record in the U.S. state of Maryland.

Tunnels

See also
List of bridges documented by the Historic American Engineering Record in Maryland

References

Tunnels
Tunnels
Maryland